The Jardin botanique de Saint-Chamond (7,000 m²) is a botanical garden located at 4 chemin du Jardin Botanique, Saint-Chamond, Loire, Auvergne-Rhône-Alpes, France. It is open by appointment.

The garden was created by Michel Manevy on the site of a former peach nursery. It now contains about 4,500 plants arranged into various gardens including English and Japanese gardens, Italian garden, herb garden, a pergola, and a pathway paved as an Aztec calendar.

See also 
 List of botanical gardens in France

References 
 Tourisme St-Etienne entry
 Rhône-Alpes Culture entry (French)
 Saint-Chamond: Guide d’accueil (French), page 38.

Saint-Chamond, Jardin botanique de
Saint-Chamond, Jardin botanique de